Marko Perković (born 27 October 1966) is a Croatian musician who has been the lead singer of the band Thompson since 1991.

Perković was born in the village of Čavoglave, SR Croatia, within SFR Yugoslavia, today a part of Croatia. He participated in the Croatian War of Independence (1991–95), during which he started his career with the nationalist song "Bojna Čavoglave". In 2002, he started his first major tour after the release of the E, moj narode album. Since 2005, he has been organizing an unofficial celebration of the Victory Day in his birthplace of Čavoglave. 

During his career, Perković has attracted controversy in the media over his performances and songs, some of which are alleged to glorify or promote the World War II-era Croatian fascist Ustaše dictatorship.

Early life

Perković was born in 1966 in Čavoglave (at the time SR Croatia, SFR Yugoslavia) to Marija and Ante. He rarely saw his father, who worked as a Gastarbeiter in Germany and rarely came home. He finished high school in Split. In 1991, Croatia declared independence from Yugoslavia, prompting the Croatian War of Independence. Perković joined the Croatian forces and used the American Thompson gun during his time in the war, which became his nickname and later, his stage name.

It was while he was defending his home village that Perković became inspired to write one of the most popular songs during the war; "Bojna Čavoglave" (Čavoglave Battalion), which launched his music career. In 1992 Perković held concerts throughout Croatia, and released his first album that same year. He continued to write songs during the war. In 1995 he returned to the Croatian Army and the 142nd Drniš Brigade, and became one of the first soldiers to enter the captured cities of Drniš and Knin during Operation Storm.

Career

After the war, Thompson's popularity declined. However in 2002, Thompson experienced a resurgence as Perković embraced right-wing critics of the Croatian center-left coalition government who protested the government's cooperation with the International Criminal Tribunal for the former Yugoslavia (ICTY) in extraditing indicted war criminals.

On 15 September 2002, he had his largest concert to date at the Poljud Stadium in Split with about 40,000 visitors.

In 2007 he surpassed the 2002 concert at the Maksimir Stadium in Zagreb on 17 June 2007, with 60,000 people attending. His concert at the stadium was aired live on the state owned HRT Plus pay-per-view channel, and several days later on the main national channel as well.

Perković during his career has cited Mate Bulić, Nightwish, Iron Maiden, AC/DC and Dream Theater as main influences.

In 2009, a concert in the Swiss city of Lucerne was canceled after the Social Democratic Party called for an urgent statement on the issue of Thompson's concert, calling Perković a fascist. He was then banned from performing in Switzerland, after the Swiss Service for Analysis and Prevention (DAP) stated that his texts are glorifying the Nazi-affiliated Ustaše of the Independent State of Croatia. The ban was subsequently lifted and he continued having concerts in Switzerland.

The lyrics of his songs often feature patriotic sentiments and relate to religion, family, the Croatian War of Independence, politics and media, but also contain notorious references to war crimes. Accused of neo-Nazism, in 2004, the band was prohibited from performing in Amsterdam by the local authorities, although he held a concert in Rotterdam.

As Switzerland is a member of the Schengen Agreement, Thompson was prohibited from entering into all Schengen countries for a period of three years, confirmed by Michele Cercone, spokesman for the Vice President of the European Commission.

Perković created controversy by allegedly performing "Jasenovac i Gradiška Stara", a song that openly glorifies the Ustaše regime, its crimes against humanity during World War II and the genocide of Serbs. The Simon Wiesenthal Centre filed complaints to Croatia's state television channel regarding its broadcast of a singer accused of expressing nostalgia for the Ustaše, although Perković denied any connection with that time period. The complaints were ignored. Perković denied writing or even performing the song, stating he is "a musician, not a politician". 

Some of his fans are known for their ultranationalism, demonstrated by Ustaše uniforms (including black hats associated with the movement), symbols, and banners. At the beginning of the song "Bojna Čavoglave", Perković invokes Za dom - spremni! (lit. "For home (land) – ready!"). In 2015, Perkovic performed in Knin in front of some 80,000 spectators for the 20th anniversary celebration of the Croatian military’s Operation Storm with many of those in attendance singing pro-Ustasha songs and chanting slogans such as "Kill a Serb" and "Here we go Ustasha". 

Perković and his band's inclusion in Croatia's celebration of the national team's second place finish in the 2018 FIFA World Cup also garnered controversy and criticism.

Perković's alleged glorification for the Ustaše have led to him being accused in some publications, including the Simon Wiesenthal Center, of being a "fascist singer".

Personal life
In the mid-1990s he was in a relationship with Croatian singer Danijela Martinović. Although never legally married, they had a Catholic marriage ceremony. After their separation, he sought a Church annulment, which was granted by the Ecclesiastical Court in Split in 2005. Thus, he was able to have a church marriage with his wife Sandra Rogić, a Croatian-Canadian he met during a concert in Canada. Together they have five children: Katarina, Cvita, Ante Mihael, Diva Maria and Petar Šimun.

He owns a 20% share of the radio station Narodni radio, a privately owned Croatian radio station notable for airing exclusively Croatian songs.

Pope Benedict XVI received Perković in an audience in December 2009.

Discography

Studio albums
1992 – Bojna Čavoglave (za dom spremni)

1992 – Moli mala 
1995 – Vrijeme škorpiona 
1996 – Geni kameni 
1998 – Vjetar s Dinare 
2002 – E, moj narode
2006 – Bilo jednom u Hrvatskoj
2011 – Glazba iz filma Josef 
2013 – Ora et labora

Compilation albums 
 2001 – The best of
 2003 – Sve najbolje
 2008 – Druga strana
 2015 – The best of collection
 2016 – Antologija

Concert videos
 2002 – Turneja: E, moj narode
 2007 – Turneja: Bilo jednom u Hrvatskoj
 2013 – Turneja: Ora et labora

See also
Thompson (band)

References and notes

External links
 Official website of Thompson 
 Songs lyrics

1966 births
Living people
People from Ružić, Croatia
20th-century Croatian male singers
Croatian pop singers
Croatian rock singers
Croatian singer-songwriters
Croatian Roman Catholics
Croatian businesspeople
Croatian soldiers
Croatian nationalists
Croatian anti-communists
Far-right politics in Croatia
21st-century Croatian male singers
Nationalist musicians